Historical Chinese anthems comprise a number of official and unofficial national anthems of China composed during the Qing dynasty and the Republic of China.

"Chinese national anthem" may refer to: 
  "March of the Volunteers" of the People's Republic of China
  "National Anthem of the Republic of China" of the Republic of China

Tune of Li Zhongtang 

Quasi-official

In 1896, for purposes of diplomatic missions to Western Europe and Russia, Li Hongzhang (Zhongtang being a term of respect for a vizier or prime minister) employed in political lyrics combined with classical Chinese music to create a song later known as the "Tune of Li Zhongtang" (李中堂樂).

Praise the Dragon Flag

Quasi-official

After the Department of the Army was established in 1906, Praise the Dragon Flag became the army song, and has been played at formal occasions overseas.

¹ 兆 usually means one trillion (1012), but it could mean one million (106), and should have that value here in the song for factual accuracy. See Chinese numerals for details.

Cup of Solid Gold (1911–1912)

Official

The Cup of Solid Gold became the official national anthem of the Qing Empire in less than a week when the Wuchang Uprising occurred in 1911. It lasted for about one year until the end of the empire and the establishment of the Republic of China. It is in classical Chinese.

Song of Five Races Under One Union

Provisional

After the establishment of the provisional government in Nanjing, the Ministry of Education under Cai Yuanpei asked the public for possible anthems (as well as coats of arms), and "Song of Five Races under One Union" (五旗共和歌), with lyrics by Shen Enfu (沈恩孚) and music by Shen Pengnian (沈彭年), was released as a draft in the newspaper.

How Great is Our China! 
Unofficial

Also called "Patriotic Song" (愛國歌), "How Great is Our China!" (泱泱哉，我中華！) has lyrics written by Liang Qichao and music by overseas Chinese at Datong School (大同學校), Yokohama. Released in 1912, it became quite popular, especially among students.

Song to the Auspicious Cloud (1913–1928)

Official

The Song to the Auspicious Cloud has two versions, one used in 1913 and another after 1920.

First version 
On April 8, 1913, this national anthem was used in the opening ceremony of the 1st Regular Council; the last line was added by Wang Baorong (汪寶榮), with other lines from Shang Shu; it was set to music by Jeans Hautstont.

Second version 
In November 1919, Duan Qirui established the National Anthem Research Committee (國歌研究會), which adopted:
 The lyrics (1920) by Zhang Taiyan (章太炎) from the classic "The Song to the Auspicious Cloud" (卿雲歌) from the Book of Documents.
 The music (1921) by Beijing professor, Xiao Youmei (蕭友梅).
The anthem was released in July 1921 by the Department of National Affairs (國務院).

¹糺 (jiū "collaborate") is sometimes written as 糾 (jiū "investigate") or 織 (zhī "to web")

China Heroically Stands in the Universe (1915–1921)

Official

After general Yuan Shikai became head of state, the Ritual Regulations Office (禮制館) issued the new official anthem, China Heroically Stands in the Universe (中國雄立宇宙間) in June 1915. Its lyrics were written by Yin Chang (廕昌) and music by Wang Lu (王露).

Song of the National Revolution 
Provisional

Written by officers of the Whampoa Military Academy, the "Revolution of the Citizens" song (國民革命歌, Guomin Geming Ge), sung to the tune of "Frère Jacques (commonly known as "Two Tigers" in China)," was released on July 1, 1926.

The Internationale 

When the Chinese Soviet Republic was established in 1931, the Internationale in Chinese was decided to be its national anthem, since it followed the ideals of Communism, especially the Soviet Union.

See also 
 "National Flag Anthem of the Republic of China"
 "Ode to the Motherland"
 Tibetan National Anthem
 National Anthem of Manchukuo

References

External links 
 This links to several of these anthems, including Audio, lyrics, and sheet music

Anthems
National symbols of China
China
Chinese patriotic songs
Chinese